Elachista spatiosa is a moth of the family Elachistidae. It is found in California, United States.

The length of the forewings is 5.7 mm. The ground color of the forewings is white, weakly powdered with ocherous scales, particularly in the middle of the wing at the fold where they form an indistinct elongate spot. The hindwings are white and the underside of the wings is light gray.

References

Moths described in 1948
spatiosa
Moths of North America